is a railway station on the Ban'etsu West Line in the town of Inawashiro, Fukushima Prefecture, Japan, operated by East Japan Railway Company (JR East).

Lines

Station layout
Kawageta Station has two opposed side platforms connected to the station building by a footbridge. The station is unattended.

Platforms

History
Kawageta Station opened on August 4, 1899 for freight operations and on November 3, 1900 for passenger operations. A private branch line, the Bandai Express Electric Railway extended from this station to Numajiri from 1913 to 1969.  The station was absorbed into the JR East network upon the privatization of the Japanese National Railways (JNR) on April 1, 1987.

Surrounding area
 Kawageta Post Office

External links
 JR East Station information 

Railway stations in Fukushima Prefecture
Ban'etsu West Line
Railway stations in Japan opened in 1899
Inawashiro, Fukushima